= The Wheeler Report =

The Wheeler Report is a legislative news service covering the Wisconsin legislature. The daily emailed subscriber report tracks all legislation introduced; including bill referrals, hearing notices, executive session action, floor action, and action by the Governor. The report writes summaries of appeals court decisions and Supreme Court decisions. Additionally, the Wheeler Report provides a detailed tracking of the Wisconsin biennial budget, including all action by the Wisconsin Joint Finance Committee.

The Wheeler Report website is an online news service that publishes articles, editorials, and press releases concerning Wisconsin politics. It was founded in 1972 by Dick Wheeler, a longtime journalist and dean of the Capitol press corps.
